Alamarvdasht is a district (bakhsh) in Lamerd County, Fars Province, Iran. At the 2006 census, its population was 14,915, in 3,174 families.  The District has one city: Alamarvdasht. The District has two rural districts (dehestan): Alamarvdasht Rural District and Kheyrgu Rural District.

References 

 Geography of Alamarvdasht (Persian)

 
Lamerd County
Districts of Fars Province